Michael Groom was an association football player who represented New Zealand at international level.

Groom made his full All Whites debut in a 1–1 draw with Fiji on 19 February 1980, and ended his international playing career with 20 A-international caps and 5 goals to his credit, his final cap gained in a 0–1 loss to Bahrain on 24 April 1984. He now teaches full-time at St Paul's Collegiate school in Hamilton. He believes in "The Bounce" philosophy, and has led St Paul's to 7 consecutive national tournaments. However, they have never won any trophies. During his time at St Paul's he has tutored numerous New Zealand football representatives, including Futsal Whites players John Penyas and Elliot Collier, and most notably All Whites and Leicester City striker Chris Wood. His early influences that inspired his methodology were Tony the talking football. Through listening to Tony and his friend Leonard Steve Davies, Michael was inspired to teach youth about the samba and the skill.

Club history 
Hamilton (1980)
Manurewa (1983–1984)

See also
List of people with surname Groom

References

External links
New Zealand Listener article – Soccer's samba revolution by Margaret Forde

Living people
Manurewa AFC players
New Zealand association footballers
New Zealand international footballers
Year of birth missing (living people)
Association football midfielders
1980 Oceania Cup players